Cedar Grove Lutheran Church is a historic Lutheran Church located at Batesburg-Leesville, Lexington County, South Carolina. It was designed by architect Louis H. Asbury built in 1926–1927.  It is a Late Gothic Revival style brick building. It features a crenelated belfry topped by a multi-faceted metal shingle-clad spire.

It was listed on the National Register of Historic Places in 2010.

References

Lutheran churches in South Carolina
20th-century Lutheran churches in the United States
Churches on the National Register of Historic Places in South Carolina
Gothic Revival church buildings in South Carolina
Churches completed in 1927
Buildings and structures in Lexington County, South Carolina
National Register of Historic Places in Lexington County, South Carolina